The 2005–06 Cincinnati Bearcats men's basketball team represented the University of Cincinnati during the 2005–06 NCAA Division I men's basketball season. The team played its home games in Cincinnati, Ohio at the Fifth Third Arena, which has a capacity of 13,176. They are members of the Big East Conference and were led by first-year head coach Andy Kennedy after the resignation of longtime coach Bob Huggins. The Bearcats finished the season 23–13, 8–8 in Big East play.

The Bearcats played in the 2006 NIT, as the 1 seed in their own region. The Bearcats advanced to the Quarterfinals, before losing to the eventual champion 3 seed South Carolina team.

Previous season
The Bearcats finished the 2004–05 season 25–8, 12–4 in Conference USA play, finishing tied for second place. They entered as the No. 3 seed in the Conference USA tournament and were upset in the Quarterfinals by No. 11 seed South Florida.. The Bearcats were awarded an at-large bid to the 2005 NCAA Division I men's basketball tournament. As the No. 7 seed in the Austin region, they defeated No. 10 seed Iowa in the first round before falling to the No. 2 seed Kentucky.

Much of the offseason was filled with continued drama between then head coach Bob Huggins and University of Cincinnati president Nancy Zimpher. By late August, Huggins was given an ultimatum by Zimpher to resign or be fired. Huggins opted to resign and accept his buyout. Zimpher said that the Bearcat program under Huggins didn't fit with her plan to upgrade UC's academic reputation. However, she'd been seriously considering ousting Huggins since he was arrested for driving under the influence in 2004. He ultimately pleaded no contest to DUI.

Andy Kennedy was named head coach on an interim basis for the 2005–06 season.

Roster

Schedule and results

|-
!colspan=12 style=|Exhibition
|-

|-
!colspan=12 style=|Regular Season
|-

|-
!colspan=12 style=|Big East tournament 
|-

|-
!colspan=12 style=|National Invitational Tournament 
|-

References

Cincinnati Bearcats men's basketball seasons
Cincinnati
Cincin
Cincin